Taegŏn station is a railway station in Chŭngsan-dong, Sunch'ŏn city, South P'yŏngan Province, North Korea, on the Taegŏn Line of the Korean State Railway, where it connects with the Ŭnsan Line to Ŭnsan on the Pyongra Line. It is also the starting point of the Chiktong Colliery Line to the colliery at Chiktong T'an'gwang and of the Mohak Line to Mohak.

References

Railway stations in North Korea
Buildings and structures in South Pyongan Province